The Inheritance is an upcoming American thriller film directed by Alejandro Brugués from a screenplay by Chris LaMont and Joe Russo.

Cast
 Rachel Nichols
 Bob Gunton 
 Austin Stowell 
 Briana Middleton
 David Walton 
 Reese Alexander
 Peyton List

Production
In April 2021, it was announced that Alejandro Brugués was set to direct The Last Will and Testament of Charles Abernathy from a screenplay written by Chris LaMont and Joe Russo. Netflix would produce and distribute. The next month, Rachel Nichols, Bob Gunton, Austin Stowell, Briana Middleton, David Walton, Reese Alexander and Peyton List were announced to star.

Principal photography began on April 12, 2021 and concluded on June 25, 2021 in Victoria, British Columbia.

In January 2023, it was announced that Netflix had dropped the completed film, now titled The Inheritance, and that it would be shopped to other distributors.

References

External links
 

Upcoming films
American thriller films
Upcoming English-language films
Films shot in Vancouver